Miguel Figueroa (died 10 May 1517) was a Roman Catholic prelate who served as Bishop of Patti (1500–1517) and as Auxiliary Bishop of Zaragoza (1500)

Biography
On 4 September 1500, he was appointed by Pope Alexander VI as Bishop of Patti and Auxiliary Bishop of Zaragoza. On 8 November 1501, he was consecrated bishop by Juan Ortega Bravo de la Laguna, Bishop of Calahorra y La Calzada, with Guillermo Ramón de Moncada, Bishop of Tarazona, and Juan Crespo, Bishop of Ales, serving as co-consecrators. He served as Bishop of Patti until his death on 10 May 1517.

See also
Catholic Church in Italy

References

External links and additional sources
 (for Chronology of Bishops) 
 (for Chronology of Bishops) 

1517 deaths
16th-century Roman Catholic bishops in Sicily
Bishops appointed by Pope Alexander VI